The R548 is a Regional Route in South Africa that connects Delmas with Balfour via Devon.

Route

Mpumalanga
Its northern terminus is the R50 east of Delmas, Mpumalanga. From there it first runs south, then south-east, crossing into Gauteng to reach Devon.

Gauteng
In Devon, it is briefly cosigned with the R29 when it intersects with it before leaving to the south-west. It gives off the west-south-westerly R550 and crosses the N17. It re-enters Mpumalanga, and ends its route at an intersection with the R51 just before Balfour.

References

Regional Routes in Gauteng
Regional Routes in Mpumalanga